Glenwolde Park Historic District is a national historic district located at Tarrytown, Westchester County, New York. It encompasses 10 contributing buildings, 2 contributing sites, and 1 contributing structure in a distinctive residential enclave of Tarrytown.  It was developed in 1926 and consists of a small number of attached and freestanding dwellings in the Tudor Revival, Colonial Revival, and Dutch Colonial style.

It was listed on the National Register of Historic Places in 2014.

References

Historic districts on the National Register of Historic Places in New York (state)
Tudor Revival architecture in New York (state)
Colonial Revival architecture in New York (state)
Houses completed in 1926
Historic districts in Westchester County, New York
National Register of Historic Places in Westchester County, New York